Leila Benali is a Moroccan economist and politician. Since October 2021, she is the Minister of Energy Transition and Sustainable Development.

Education and academic career 
She studied engineering at the Ecole Central de Paris and Ecole Mohammadia School and obtained a Master of Arts in engineering. Besides she also received a Master of Arts in politics in Politics and a Ph.D. in economics from Sciences Po in Paris. From 2002 to 2015 she lectured Energy Strategies at Sciences Po.

Professional career 
According to her LinkedIn profile she has been an industrial engineer for the oil services operator Schlumberger from 2000 to 2001 and directed the gas and energy policy for the Saudi Aramco between 2014 and 2018 before becoming the chief economist of APICORP in 2018. She was a member of the Global Future Council Member on mobility of the World Economic Forum from 2018 to 2021. In March 2021, she was elected as the Chief Economist of the International Energy Forum in Riyadh.

Political career 
On the 7 October 2021, she was appointed as the Moroccan Minister of Energy Transition and Sustainable Development in the Government headed by Prime Minister Aziz Akhannouch. As such she supports a better regional energy cooperation of Morocco within Africa but also with Europe.

References 

Living people
Women government ministers of Morocco
Moroccan economists
Sciences Po alumni
École Centrale Paris alumni
Year of birth missing (living people)
21st-century Moroccan women politicians
21st-century Moroccan politicians